Grace Burrows (29 June 1893 – 1981) was an English violinist, violin teacher and orchestra conductor.

Life and career 

Grace Burrows was born in Leicester, the daughter of Dr. Benjamin Harper Burrows (1864–1915) who served as organist for a number of churches in the Leicester area. She was also the sister of composer Benjamin Burrows (1891–1966). In the early 1920s she played viola in an ensemble called The Birmingham Quartet. She was appointed as a Lecturer in Music at the University College, Leicester, in 1924. In 1922 she served as the founding leader of the Leicester Symphony Orchestra, and in 1934 she also conducted the British Women’s Symphony Orchestra. She
died at age 87. Notable students include Joyce Howard Barrell.

Works 
Although best known as a violinist, teacher and orchestra leader, Burrows also published didactic music for violin. Selected works include:

Easy Exercises and Studies in the Third Position (1935)

References

External links 
The British Women's Symphony Orchestra (1934) conducted by Grace Burrows from Youtube.

1893 births
1980 deaths
English conductors (music)
Women conductors (music)
English classical violinists
British music educators
Orchestra leaders
Academics of the University of Leicester
People from Leicester
Musicians from Leicestershire
20th-century British conductors (music)
20th-century classical violinists
20th-century English musicians
Women classical violinists
20th-century English women musicians
Women music educators